The Battle of Fort Rivière was the most remembered battle of the United States occupation of Haiti in 1915. U.S Marines and sailors fought at Fort Rivière against rebel Cacos.

Background
Fort Rivière was an old masonry fort built atop the steep Montagne Noire by the French in the 18th century. It was held by over 200 Cacos in November 1915 during their rebellion against the Haitian government. No artillery remained at the fort, but the defenders were armed with rifles, machetes, swords, knives and other things. Cacos were described as poor marksmen, so when the U.S. Marine Major Smedley Butler arrived to take the fort, rebel resistance crumbled. Butler commanded three 24-man companies of veteran U.S. Marines which he chose himself, along with a few lieutenants and a small detachment of sailors from the battleship  sailing off the coast.

Battle
Confident that his force could capture the fort, Smedley Butler prepared his men for battle at about 19:00. The Americans surrounded the fort without raising the alarm and waited for Butler to blow his whistle. At 19:30, Butler blew his whistle and a surprise assault was launched against the fort from the south. Butler and 26 men advanced while the remaining Marines and sailors provided covering fire. Along the forts southern wall was a small tunnel leading into the fortification. The 26 men advanced and the Cacos opened fire. First Sergeant Ross Iams and Private Samuel Gross entered the tunnel and went into the fort, followed by Butler.

When the three men exited the tunnel on the other side of the wall, they opened fire on an estimated 60 rebels. Once the first wave of Marines entered the stronghold, the rest of the Marines and sailors attacked. Combat lasted for 10 to 15 minutes before the surviving Cacos fled. More than 50 were killed and none were taken prisoner. More than 20 of the rebels were killed when they fled the fort by jumping over the parapet under heavy fire. One Marine lieutenant reportedly was wounded when a Caco struck him in the face with a rock, knocking out two of his teeth. The Cacos, not knowing what the gunsight was used for, typically threw down their weapons and armed themselves with stones when closely encountered by Marines.

Aftermath
With Fort Rivière taken, the First Caco War came to an end as the Haitian rebels no longer held any more ground. Conflict to resist the American occupation did not end there however. Minor skirmishing continued for a short while and later in 1919, a conflict known as the Second Caco War would erupt. Despite being a smaller engagement in terms of numbers and casualties, the capture of Fort Rivière is much more remembered than the battle at Fort Dipitie where Captain Butler led forty U.S. Marines against 400 Cacos and won. Captain Smedley Butler, Sergeant Iams and Private Gross all were awarded Medals of Honor for actions taken during this engagement. After the battle and the high Haitian losses, the U.S. government ordered the U.S. Marines to cease offensive operations against the Cacos without direct permission from Washington.

See also
Banana Wars

References

Editors of the Boston Publishing Company (1985) Above and Beyond, A History of the Medal of Honor from the Civil War to Vietnam.Page# 113 

Langley, Lester D. (1985). The Banana Wars: United States Intervention in the Caribbean, 1898–1934 Lexington: University Press of Kentucky 

Republic of Haiti (1859–1957)
Fort Rivière
November 1915 events
1915 in Haiti
Conflicts in 1915